Joseph Nduhirubusa (April 24, 1938 – July 16, 2012) was the Roman Catholic bishop of the Roman Catholic Diocese of Ruyigi, Burundi.

Ordained to the priesthood in 1964, Nduhirubusa was and named bishop in 1980 and resigned in 2010.

Notes

20th-century Roman Catholic bishops in Burundi
1938 births
2012 deaths
21st-century Roman Catholic bishops in Burundi
Roman Catholic bishops of Ruyigi